The Montreal Carabins women's ice hockey team defend the colors of the Université de Montréal and are members of the Quebec Student Sports Federation (RSEQ), and compete for the Canadian Interuniversity Sport women's ice hockey championship. One Carabins player have participated internationally, including the World Student Games. Home games are contested at l'aréna du CEPSUM. In addition, the Women's ice hockey team are connected to the club Montreal Carabins.

History

The 2009-10 season was their first competing in CIS. The Carabins finished second during the regular season and claimed the fifth position in the CIS Canadian championship. In their second season (2010-11), the team ranked in second place in the Québécois conference behind McGill Martlets. In the 2011 playoffs, the Carabins eliminated the Concordia Stingers but the Carabins are in turn to eliminate in finale by McGill. In their second season, they did not qualify for the CIS Canadian championships. 

On October 29, 2011, Carabins skater Ariane Barker scored with 71 seconds left to give the squad a 3-2 win at McConnell Arena. Martlets goaltender Charline Labonte took the loss for the Martlets, giving her a 69-2 overall record in her CIS career. It marked the Martlets first loss to a Quebec conference opponent for the first time in 108 games.

In the 2011-12 season, the Carabins reach in finale national in their third season of existence only. The Carabins lose however in finale against Calgary Dinos,. The Carabins women ice hockey team deserve the first medal of their young history (a Silver medal),

Current Roster 2011-2012 

Reference

Staff 2011-2012 

 General manager Danièle Sauvageau
 Councillor-Adviser France St-Louis
 Head Coach: Isabelle Leclaire
 Assistant Coach: Brittany Privée
 Assistant Coach: Pascal Daoust
 Goaltender Coach: Nicolas Champagne

Reference

Awards and honours

RSEQ Awards
2010 QSSF Rookie of the Year, Kim Deschênes
2014-15 RSEQ MOST OUTSTANDING PLAYER: Ariane Barker

RSEQ All-Stars
First Team
2009-10 QSSF First Team All-Star, Kim Deschênes, Forward
2009-10 QSSF First Team All-Star, Marie-Hélène Suc, Defence
2009-10 QSSF Second Team All-Star, Marie-Andrée Leclerc-Auger

After the 2010-11 season, Forwards Josianne Legault, Kim Deschênes, the Defencemen Stéphanie Daneau, Janique Duval and goaltender Rachel Ouellette were named to the All-Star teams of the league .

2014-15 RSEQ  First Team All-Star: Ariane Barker
2014-15 RSEQ  First Team All-Star: Élodie Rousseau-Sirois
2016-17 RSEQ First Team All-Stars: Jessica Cormier

Second Team
2014-15 RSEQ Second Team All-Star:Janique Duval
2016-17 RSEQ Second Team All-Stars: Maude Laramée

RSEQ All-Rookie
2014-15 RSEQ All-Rookie Team: Alexandra Paradis 
2014-15 RSEQ All-Rookie Team: Jessica Cormier 
2019-20 RSEQ ALL-ROOKIE TEAM: Annabel Faubert 
2019-20 RSEQ ALL-ROOKIE TEAM: Joannie Garand

USports Awards
Sophie Brault, 2012-13 USports Second Team All-Star

International
Kim Deschênes : 2011 Winter Universiade
Élodie Rousseau-Sirois : 2015 Winter Universiade 
Ariane Barker : 2015 Winter Universiade 
Élizabeth Mantha : 2015 Winter Universiade 
Jessica Cormier, Forward: 2017 Winter Universiade 
Catherine Dubois, Forward: 2017 Winter Universiade 
Alexandra Labelle, Forward: 2017 Winter Universiade 
Maude Laramée, Defense : 2017 Winter Universiade 
Annabel Faubert  :  Ice hockey at the 2019 Winter Universiade

Carabins in professional hockey

See also
2009–10 Montreal Carabins women's ice hockey season
2010–11 Montreal Carabins women's ice hockey season
Montreal Carabins
Canadian Interuniversity Sport women's ice hockey championship

References

External links
 Official Website of Montreal Carabins women's ice hockey

 
U Sports women's ice hockey teams
Carabins
U Sports teams in Quebec
Women's ice hockey teams in Canada
Ice hockey teams in Montreal
Montreal Carabins